Pierre Simon Grany (23 January 1899 – 21 November 1988) was a French track and field athlete who competed in the 1920 Summer Olympics. In 1920 he finished 14th in the javelin throw competition.

References

External links
profile

1899 births
1988 deaths
French male javelin throwers
Olympic athletes of France
Athletes (track and field) at the 1920 Summer Olympics